Andre Beaudoin is a Paralympic athlete from Canada competing mainly in category T52 sprint events.

He competed in the 1988 Summer Paralympics in Seoul, South Korea.  There he won a gold medal in the men's 200 metres - 1C event, a silver medal in the men's 100 metres - 1C event, a silver medal in the men's 400 metres - 1C event and a bronze medal in the men's 800 metres - 1C event.  He also competed at the 1992 Summer Paralympics in Barcelona, Spain.   There he won a silver medal in the men's 100 metres - TW2 event, a bronze medal in the men's 200 metres - TW2 event, finished fourth in the men's 800 metres - TW2 event and finished tenth in the men's Marathon - TW2 event.  He also competed at the 1996 Summer Paralympics in Atlanta, United States.  There he won a silver medal in the men's 100 metres - T51 event, a bronze medal in the men's 400 metres - T51 event, finished fourth in the men's 200 metres - T51 event and finished sixth in the men's 1500 metres - T51 event.  He also competed in the 2000 Summer Paralympics in Sydney, Australia.  There he won a silver medal in the men's 200 metres - T52 event, a bronze medal in the men's 100 metres - T52 event and finished fourth in the men's 400 metres - T52 event.  He also competed at the 2004 Summer Paralympics in Athens, Greece.  There he won a gold medal in the men's 200 metres - T52 event, a silver medal in the men's 400 metres - T52 event, a bronze medal in the men's 100 metres - T52 event and finished fifth in the men's 800 metres - T52 event.  He also competed at the 2008 Summer Paralympics in Beijing, China.   There he won a bronze medal in the men's 100 metres - T52 event, finished fourth in the men's 200 metres - T52 event, finished eighth in the men's 400 metres - T52 event and finished seventh in the men's 800 metres - T52 event

External links
 

Paralympic track and field athletes of Canada
Athletes (track and field) at the 1988 Summer Paralympics
Athletes (track and field) at the 1992 Summer Paralympics
Athletes (track and field) at the 1996 Summer Paralympics
Athletes (track and field) at the 2000 Summer Paralympics
Athletes (track and field) at the 2004 Summer Paralympics
Athletes (track and field) at the 2008 Summer Paralympics
Paralympic gold medalists for Canada
Paralympic silver medalists for Canada
Paralympic bronze medalists for Canada
Living people
Medalists at the 1988 Summer Paralympics
Medalists at the 1992 Summer Paralympics
Medalists at the 1996 Summer Paralympics
Medalists at the 2000 Summer Paralympics
Medalists at the 2004 Summer Paralympics
Medalists at the 2008 Summer Paralympics
Year of birth missing (living people)
Paralympic medalists in athletics (track and field)
Canadian male wheelchair racers